Whoracle is the third studio album by Swedish heavy metal band In Flames, released on 18 November 1997. The title of the album is a portmanteau of the English words "whore" and "oracle".

Apart from "Everything Counts", which is a cover of a Depeche Mode song, all songs were composed and arranged by In Flames. The lyrics were translated by Dark Tranquillity guitarist Niklas Sundin, after Anders Fridén had written them in Swedish.

Whoracle is the final album to feature Johan Larsson and Glenn Ljungström. It is also the last In Flames release with Björn Gelotte playing drums, as he permanently switched to lead guitar in future releases. Fredrik Nordström noted that it was not easy to record at times, since the band members usually preferred drinking beer and playing Tekken 3.

In 2020, it was named one of the 20 best metal albums of 1997 by Metal Hammer magazine.

Concept 
Whoracle is a concept album which describes the past, present, and a hypothetical future of the planet Earth. "Jotun" is a foreshadowing of the main concepts where a society is crushed and broken after an apocalyptic event. "Episode 666" seems to be the narration of this apocalyptic event which is, perversely, televised. The songs leading up to this tell a story of the rise and fall of a global society. "The Hive" and "Jester Script Transfigured" describe this technologically advanced society and a utopian world which is demolished by human nature in the next two songs. The inclusion of the Depeche Mode cover, "Everything Counts", is a poignant way to imply that the people who built then destroyed their society realized their folly after it was too late.

Track listing
All lyrics written by Niklas Sundin and Anders Fridén.

Personnel
In Flames
Anders Fridén – vocals, additional percussion
Glenn Ljungström – lead guitar
Jesper Strömblad – rhythm guitar, keyboards, additional percussion
Johan Larsson – bass
Björn Gelotte – drums, percussion, additional lead guitar

Other personnel
Ulrika Netterdahl – female vocals on song "Whoracle"
The Whoracle concept conjured and verbalized by Niklas Sundin and Anders Fridén
Lyrics written by Niklas Sundin following original synopsis by Anders Fridén
All music composed and arranged by In Flames except "Everything Counts" by Martin Lee Gore of Depeche Mode
Recorded and produced by Fredrik Nordström with assistance from In Flames
Engineered by Anders Fridén and Fredrik Nordström
Mixed by Fredrik Nordström and Anders Fridén
Mastered by Goran Finnberg and Fredrik Nordstrom at the Mastering Room Gbg
Cover artwork by Andreas Marschall
Photos by Kenneth Johansson
All songs published by Prophecies Publishing Hamburg except "Everything Counts"
"Everything Counts" published by Grabbing Hands Music Ltd, sub-published by EMI Music Germany

References

In Flames albums
Nuclear Blast albums
1997 albums
Concept albums
Albums recorded at Studio Fredman
Albums produced by Fredrik Nordström